Uruçuí is a municipality in the state of Piauí in the Northeast region of Brazil. It is the largest municipality in that state by area.

See also
List of municipalities in Piauí

References

Municipalities in Piauí